The 2021 All-Ireland Minor Football Championship was the 90th staging of the All-Ireland Minor Football Championship since its establishment by the Gaelic Athletic Association in 1929. The championship began on 26 June 2021 and ended on 28 August 2021.

The 2021 championship was the first in over 90 years to begin before the previous year's championship has concluded. Derry entered the championship as the defending champions, however, they were beaten by Armagh in the Ulster quarter-final.

The All-Ireland final was played on 28 August 2021 at Croke Park in Dublin, between Meath and Tyrone, in what was their first ever meeting in a final.
Meath won the match by 1-12 to 1-11 to claim their fourth championship title overall and a first title since 1992.

Cork's Hugh O'Connor was the championship's top scorer with 1-24.

Results

Connacht Minor Football Championship

Connacht quarter-final

Connacht semi-finals

Connacht final

Leinster Minor Football Championship

Leinster first round

Leinster quarter-finals

Leinster semi-finals

Leinster final

Munster Minor Football Championship

Munster quarter-finals

Munster semi-finals

Munster final

Ulster Minor Football Championship

Ulster preliminary round

Ulster quarter-finals

Ulster semi-finals

Ulster final

All-Ireland Minor Football Championship

All-Ireland semi-finals

All-Ireland final

Championship statistics

Top scorers

Top scorer overall

In a single game

Miscellaneous

 Sligo won the Connacht Championship for the first time since 1968.
 Cork won the Munster Championship for the first time since 2010.

References

All-Ireland Minor Football Championship
All-Ireland Minor Football Championship